Urger, originally named H.J. Dornbos or Henry J. Dornbos, is a historic canal tugboat based at Waterford in Saratoga County, New York.

Design and construction
H. J. Dornbos was built in 1901 as a fish tug for Verduin Brothers (William Verduin) of Grand Haven, Michigan, by Johnson Brothers Shipyard and Boiler Works of Ferrysburg, Michigan as Yard No.11.

Canal service
She was purchased for service on the New York State Barge Canal system in 1922 and was in regular use until the 1980s. She was altered in several stages through 1949. She is registered at 45 gross tons. She has a molded steel frame, deck beams, and riveted plates.

In 1991 the Urger was reactivated "to educate school children and adults about the importance of New York's historic Canal System."  As of 2013 the Urger is "the flagship vessel in the New York State Canal Corporation's fleet." Urger was listed on the National Register of Historic Places in 2001.

The New York State Canal Corporation again retired Urger placing her in drydock at Waterford in 2018, with a view to transferring her to a visitor centre in Montgomery County as an onshore static exhibit. In September 2021, the tug was towed to the Corporation's maintenance shops at Lysander, Onondaga County, for engineering survey and review of her future.

References

External links

Tugboats of the United States
Ships on the National Register of Historic Places in New York (state)
1901 ships
Saratoga County, New York
National Register of Historic Places in Saratoga County, New York
Museum ships in New York (state)